In Mandaeism, a ʿniana (plural form: ʿniania ) prayer is recited during rituals such as the masiqta and priest initiation ceremonies. There is a total of 26 ʿniana prayers. They form part of the Qolasta.

Etymology
ʿNiana literally means "response," since the prayers may have originally been recited in a call and response manner.

Manuscripts and translations
Jacques de Morgan's manuscript collection included a ʿniania manuscript dating back to 1833.

The prayers have been translated into English by E. S. Drower (1959). They have also been translated into German by Mark Lidzbarski (1920).

List of niana prayers
The ʿniana prayers are numbered from 78–103 in both Drower's and Lidzbarski's versions of the Qolasta.

Prayer 78
Prayer 79: prayer for the klila for the staff (margna)
Prayer 80
Prayer 81
Prayer 82: mambuha prayer

Masbuta prayers:
Prayer 83
Prayer 84
Prayer 85
Prayer 86
Prayer 87
Prayer 88
Prayer 89
Prayer 90

Masiqta prayers:
Prayer 91
Prayer 92
Prayer 93
Prayer 94
Prayer 95
Prayer 96
Prayer 97
Prayer 98
Prayer 99
Prayer 100
Prayer 101

Communion prayer:
Prayer 102

Concluding prayer:
Prayer 103

There are also two niana poems in Book 15 of the Right Ginza, which are chapters 15 and 16 of Book 15. These two poems contain the refrain "when the chosen/proven pure one went away" (kḏ azil bhira dakia ). This refrain is also found in prayers 205 and 233–256 of the Qolasta.

See also

Qolasta
Call and response

References

External links
ʿNiani prayers (Mandaic text from the Mandaean Network)
ʿNiani prayers (Mandaic text from the Mandaean Network)
Diwan ʿNiani d-Masbuta (Mandaic text from the Mandaean Network)
Diwan ʿNiani d-Masbuta (Mandaic text from the Mandaean Network)

Mandaean prayer
Mandaic words and phrases